2-Ethoxybenzoic acid (o-ethoxybenzoic acid, EBA) is an organic compound, a carboxylic acid derived from benzoic acid.  2-Ethoxybenzoic acid is used as a component in some dental cements.

References

Benzoic acids
Salicylyl ethers